Emirates News Agency, also known as WAM, is the official news agency of the United Arab Emirates.

History and profile
The WAM was established in November 1976. It started an Arabic service on 18 June 1977, and an English service in December 1978. 

It is headquartered in Abu Dhabi and is part of National Media Council.

In addition to its national offices, it has international offices in Cairo, Beirut, Washington, Sanaa, Brussels and Islamabad. It is a member of the Gulf Cooperation Council news agencies, the Federation of Arab News Agencies (FANA), the International Islamic News Agency, the Non-Aligned News Agencies Pool and of the Organization of Asia-Pacific News Agencies (OANA).

The agency has cooperation and news exchange agreements with various news agencies, including the Sudan News Agency, Bernama (Malaysia), Xinhua (China), the Kuwait News Agency, Petra (Jordan), the Indonesian News Agency, and the Saba News Agency (Yemen). Since 2012, the agency has also been in cooperation with Anadolu Agency (Turkey). WAM launched a Hebrew language service in April 2021.

References

External links
  

1976 establishments in the United Arab Emirates
Arab news agencies
Government agencies established in 1976
Mass media in Abu Dhabi
News agencies based in the United Arab Emirates
Publicly funded broadcasters
State media